Hertford Lock (No1) is a lock situated on the River Lea on the eastern side of Hartham Common, Hertford in the English county of    Hertfordshire. It is owned and managed by Canal & River Trust and is the first lock of the River Lee Navigation.

Public access 
The lock is located on the River Lee Navigation towpath which forms part of the Lea Valley Walk

Public transport
Hertford East railway station

External links 
 London canals- Hertford Lock
 Hertford Lock - a history

Locks in Hertfordshire
Locks of the Lee Navigation
Buildings and structures in Hertford